Vörå is a municipality of Finland. In 2011, it was created from the municipalities of Vörå-Maxmo and Oravais. Vörå-Maxmo was created in 2007 from the municipalities of (old) Vörå and Maxmo. It is located in the province of Western Finland and is part of the Ostrobothnia region.

The municipality is bilingual, with the majority speaking Swedish and the minority Finnish.

As of 2014, primary industries in Vörå employ "15.5 per cent of the population, 32.9 per cent of people work in the industrial sector, and 50.3 per cent of people work in the service sector."

The Battle of Oravais during the Finnish War (1808-1809) took place in Vörå.

Old Vörå 

The population density was 8.3 inhabitants per km2. The majority were speakers of Swedish (85%) and the minority speakers of Finnish (14%).

References

External links

 Municipality of Vörå – Official website 

 
Populated places established in 2011